The 2016–17 Rider Broncs men's basketball team represented Rider University during the 2016–17 NCAA Division I men's basketball season. The Broncs, led by fifth year head coach Kevin Baggett, played their home games at Alumni Gymnasium as members of the Metro Atlantic Athletic Conference. They finished the season 18–15, 10–10 in MAAC play to finish in a tie for sixth place. They defeated Manhattan in the first round of the MAAC tournament before losing in the quarterfinals to Iona.

Previous season 
The Broncs finished the 2015–16 season 13–20, 8–12 in MAAC play to finish in a tie for seventh place. They defeated Quinnipiac in the first round of the MAAC tournament to advance to the quarterfinals where they lost to Monmouth.

Roster

Schedule and results

|-
!colspan=9 style=| Exhibition

|-
!colspan=9 style="background:#900B36; color:#FFFFFF;"| Regular season

|-
!colspan=9 style=| MAAC tournament

References

Rider Broncs men's basketball seasons
Rider
Rider Broncs
Rider Broncs